The Resurgence of Dexter Gordon is an album by American saxophonist Dexter Gordon recorded in 1960 and released on the Jazzland label.

Critical reception 

AllMusic critic Lindsay Planer stated "As the title The Resurgence of Dexter Gordon (1960) suggests, the tenor sax master resurfaced from his chronic bouts of addiction in an attempt to revive his on-again/off-again recording career. Truth be told, Gordon was actually on parole from Chino State Penitentiary and co-starring in a local Los Angeles production of The Connection -- a play ironically enough about the victims of heroin dependence. Julian "Cannonball" Adderley was able to talk the tenor into participating in a no-strings-attached studio date ... The tunes are complex and provide insight into Gordon's flawless improvisational prowess ... The Resurgence of Dexter Gordon uncovers the immeasurable talents of an artist whose musical journey passes a critical crossroads on this project".

Track listing 
All compositions by Dexter Gordon except where noted.
 "Home Run" - 5:06
 "Dolo" (Dolo Coker) – 6:14
 "Lovely Lisa" (Coker) – 7:16
 "Affair in Havana" (Coker) – 7:38
 "Jodi" – 6:37
 "Field Day" (Coker) – 6:41

Personnel 
Dexter Gordon – tenor saxophone
Martin Banks – trumpet (tracks 1-4 & 6)
Richard Boone – trombone (tracks 1-4 & 6)
Dolo Coker – piano
Charles Green – bass
Lawrence Marable – drums

References 

Jazzland Records (1960) albums
Dexter Gordon albums
1960 albums